CredoLine is a Ukrainian credit rating agency. It is the only agency in the country which assigns short-term and long-term credit ratings to Ukrainian, CIS and Eastern-European importing companies in the course of their foreign economic activity and trade financing, in particular.

History
CredoLine was established with the support of foreign export credit agencies and Ukrainian partners in June 2008 with the view to achieving maximum transparency on the information market of CIS countries and qualitative improvement of rendered services.  The described support is explained by the utmost necessity of establishment of an objective, independent and specialized rating agency, professionally able to credit assess risks of importing enterprises located in Ukraine, as well as throughout  territory of the CIS region. Now and then it’s a privately owned company with 100% Ukrainian capital, run since the foundation date by the general Director Ms. Katerina Bogdanenko.

The Agency’s Goal is to systematize and discipline the beneficial multilateral foreign economic relations between foreign partners and CIS partners on all of the cooperation stages. Different mentality, various approaches to business conduct, different legislative base, accounting standards should not be a barrier while any international transaction between mentioned parties, and with its services’ complex CredoLine is putting every effort to facilitate such multicultural business collaboration.

Services

The main Agency activity line is credit rating assignment, which can be short-term or long-term, depending on the strategy and goals the rated Company/Group of Companies pursue/s.
Creditworthiness investigations with subsequent credit opinion definition may be initiated by the rated company or by the interested counteragent (potential partner/existent business partner/financial institution which acts as a mediator between the rated company and other interested party etc.)
So, CredoLine is elaborating different kinds of creditworthiness’ investigations, such as:
 Status Credit Rating Report
 Status Credit Report
 Status Credit Report of a Bank
Apart from credit rating products, the agency is rendering its clients' different analytical products, always different by their nature and set goals. Basing on the client’s requirements, needs, deadlines etc. the agency prepares such reports:
 Status country report
 Status business trend report
 Status monitoring report
 Status market report
 Others information-analytical reports

Ratings and rating scale

In the process of credit rating assignment, the agency uses its own complex methodology. Agency’s rating methodology is based on a special balanced system of indexes, which includes the influence of country risk and is recognized by leading export credit agencies and other financial institutions. 
The completeness of indexes list used in the process of evaluation of a company's financial position and performance (absolute indexes, financial stability ratios, solvency ratios,  profitability ratios, efficiency ratios, insolvency ratios) and special procedure of reliability audit and correctness of forming basic data allow to evaluate financial position and performance of a rated company in the most objective way. 
Moreover, the given methodology is particularly adjustable within the trade financing processes and enables to accurately determine the maximum value of rating and maximum amount of credit limit.
The scale of credit rating used by the Agency analysts was elaborated as well by the agency itself for the purpose of estimation of creditworthiness, the level of financial stability, aptitude towards country risk, as well as nonpayment risk of a rated company. Like others worldwide credit rating agencies (the so-called ‘Big three credit rating agencies’  - Standard & Poor's, Moody's Investor Service and Fitch Ratings), CredoLine uses the same internationally recognized letter designations such as A, B, C and D.

For every literal rating, meaning corresponds definition, which discloses the reliability level, risk character, as well as the forecast of further business development. For instance: crBB – High creditworthiness and financial stability. The company is affected by country risk. Risk of default or delayed payment is moderate.
Rating categories from “cr AAA” to “crDD” may be modified with plus or minus sign. For example: there are three rating levels "crAА+", "crAА" и "crAА-" in the rating category “crAA”. Rating “crAА+" is just over  “crAА “.
Moreover, the agency has developed and implemented four additional categories (NOR1, NOR2, NOR3, NOR4), which reflect the reasons of rating assignment impossibility for a target company, among which there is lack of necessary information about the target company, limited duration of company’s existence, etc.

Partners

Main strategic partners of the agency are foreign export credit agencies (ECAs), exporting companies, international and local banks, factoring companies, collecting agencies and others international financial institutions.
Within such partnership CredoLine seeks to contribute to the promotion of better trade relations between Ukraine and the international business community.

See also
 Export credit agency
 Trade credit insurance
 World-wide credit rating agencies

References

External links
 CredoLine website

Credit rating agencies
Financial services companies established in 2008
Ukrainian companies established in 2008